Kalmar Municipality (Kalmar kommun) is a municipality in Kalmar County, southeastern Sweden. The city of Kalmar is the municipal seat.

The present municipality was created in 1971, when the City of Kalmar was amalgamated with five surrounding rural municipalities. The municipality consists of fifteen original local government units.

Localities
There are 16 urban areas (also called a Tätort or locality) in Kalmar Municipality.

In the table the localities are listed according to the size of the population as of December 31, 2019. The municipal seat is in bold characters.

International relations

Twin towns — sister cities

Kalmar is twinned with:
  Gdańsk, Poland (since 1991)
  Kaliningrad, Russia
  Wilmington, Delaware, United States
  Savonlinna, Finland
  Samsun, Turkey
  Panevėžys, Lithuania

References

Statistics Sweden

External links

Kalmar Municipality - Official site
University of Kalmar

 
Municipalities of Kalmar County